Lema (also, La-ma or La-mah) is a former Pomo settlement in Mendocino County, California, one of a number of Pomo settlements catalogued by Stephen Powers. One of the mines of red clay from which the Pomo people took their name was located there.

References

Former settlements in Mendocino County, California
Former populated places in California
Pomo villages